The 1926 New Hampshire gubernatorial election was held on November 2, 1926. Republican nominee Huntley N. Spaulding defeated Democratic nominee Eaton D. Sargent with 59.70% of the vote.

Primary elections
Primary elections were held on September 7, 1926.

Republican primary

Candidates
Huntley N. Spaulding, President of the New Hampshire State Board of Education
John Gilbert Winant, incumbent Governor

Results

General election

Candidates
Huntley N. Spaulding, Republican
Eaton D. Sargent, Democratic

Results

References

1926
New Hampshire
Gubernatorial